"Dope Boys" is the second single from The Game's third studio album, LAX. The song features Travis Barker playing the drums. The song samples "Eleanor Rigby" By The Beatles. The song was slated to appear in the 2008 driving game Midnight Club: Los Angeles but was omitted from the game for unknown reasons.

Music video

The official video was directed and edited by Matt Alonzo and features Travis Barker, Omar Cruz, Black Wall Street, Mr. Capone-E and BYI members. The video is interspersed with shots of The Game standing on a Los Angeles rooftop with the skyline behind him. In other shots he is seen to be wearing Beats by Dr. Dre headphones.

Covers and remixes 
The song has been freestyled by rappers Bow Wow, Rick Ross, Wiz Khalifa, and Dynasty of L.$.G. Royce da 5'9" also has a freestyle called Flow Boy on his Bar Exam 2 mixtape. There is also an unofficial remix featuring Trae on his mixtape "Streets Advocate" and Young Buck featured this song (non-album) in April 2010.

Chart position

References

External links

2008 singles
The Game (rapper) songs
Travis Barker songs
Song recordings produced by DJ Quik
Songs written by The Game (rapper)
Songs written by Travis Barker
2008 songs
Geffen Records singles
Rap rock songs